Arthur Roy Eckardt (1918/19 – May 5, 1998) was an American theologian and pastor in the United Methodist Church, described as "a pioneer in Christian-Jewish relations".

References

1910s births
1998 deaths
Methodist theologians
United Methodist Church